Keratin, type II cytoskeletal 8 also known as cytokeratin-8 (CK-8) or keratin-8 (K8) is a keratin protein that is encoded in humans by the KRT8 gene.  It is often paired with keratin 18.

Utility as an immunohistochemical stain
Antibodies to CK8 (e.g. CAM 5.2) can be used to differentiate lobular carcinoma of the breast from ductal carcinoma of the breast. CAM 5.2, an antibody that reacts with an epitope found on both CK8 and CK18, is used in immunohistochemistry to demonstrate certain forms of cancer. In normal tissue, it reacts mainly with secretory epithelia, but not with squamous epithelium, such as that found in the skin, cervix, and esophagus. However, it also reacts with a range of malignant cells, including those derived from secretory epithelia, but also some squamous carcinomata, such as spindle cell carcinoma. It is considered useful in identifying microscopic metastases of breast carcinoma in lymph nodes, and in distinguishing Paget's disease from malignant melanoma. It also reacts with neuroendocrine tumors.

Keratin 8 is often used together with keratin 18 and keratin 19 to differentiate cells of epithelial origin from hematopoietic cells in tests that enumerate circulating tumor cells in blood.

Interactions
Keratin 8 has been shown to interact with MAPK14, Pinin and PPL.

See also
Immunohistochemistry

References

Further reading

External links
 

Keratins